The Order of Parasat (Parasat ordeni; the Order of Nobility) is an order awarded by the government of Kazakhstan. It was established in 1993.

The order is awarded to notable figures in the fields of science, culture, literature and art, as well as statesmen and public figures, defenders of human rights, and others who have contributed to the spiritual or intellectual potential of Kazakhstan.

Notable recipients
Nagima Aitkhozhina (2001), Kazakh molecular biologist
Viktor Chernomyrdin (1999), for his contribution to the development of oil and gas industry in Kazakhstan, Gazprom
Pyotr Klimuk (1995), former cosmonaut
Yuri Koptev, commander of Russian Space Forces
Ondasyn Orazalin (2014), Deputy Chief of Staff of Kazakhstan
Valeri Polyakov (1999), former cosmonaut
Emomali Rahmon (2018), President of Tajikistan
Roza Rymbayeva (2000), Soviet and Kazakh singer
Yesken Sergebayev (2008), sculptor
Umut Shayakhmetova (2011), financier
Umirzak Shukeyev (1998), Deputy Prime Minister in the Government of Kazakhstan
Kuman Tastanbekov (2016), Kazakh actor during the Soviet period
Kassym-Jomart Tokayev (1996) President of Kazakhstan
Alla Vazhenina, Russian weightlifter competing for Kazakhstan

See also
Orders, decorations, and medals of Kazakhstan

References

Orders, decorations, and medals of Kazakhstan

Awards established in 1993
1993 establishments in Kazakhstan